Perceptions is a composition for trumpet soloist and large jazz orchestra composed and arranged by J. J. Johnson. The piece was commissioned by Dizzy Gillespie and recorded in 1961 for the Verve label. The instrumentation of the orchestra is unusual in that no saxophones or woodwinds are used.

Reception
The AllMusic review by Scott Yanow states: "Often reminiscent of classical music, Johnson's writing allows plenty of room for Gillespie to improvise. The result is a rather unique set of music that is well worth searching for."

Track listing
All compositions by J. J. Johnson
 "The Sword of Orion" - 4:33 
 "Jubelo" - 6:37 
 "Blue Mist" - 6:52 
 "Fantasia" - 7:35 
 "Horn of Plenty" - 5:09 
 "Ballade" - 3:30

Personnel
Dizzy Gillespie - trumpet soloist
Joe Wilder, Bernie Glow, Robert Nagel, Ernie Royal, Doc Severinsen, Nick Travis - trumpet
Urbie Green, Jimmy Knepper - trombone
Paul Faulise, Dick Hixson - bass trombone
Jim Buffington, John Barrows, Paul Ingraham, Robert Northern - French horn
Harvey Phillips, William Stanley - tuba
Gloria Agostini, Laura Newell - harp
George Duvivier - double bass
Charlie Persip - drums
Michael Colgrass - percussion
Gunther Schuller - conductor

Production
Rudy Van Gelder - recording engineer
Pete Turner - photography

References 

1961 albums
Dizzy Gillespie albums
Albums produced by Creed Taylor
Albums conducted by Gunther Schuller
Albums arranged by J. J. Johnson
Albums recorded at Van Gelder Studio
Verve Records albums